Voelker is a surname. Notable people with the surname include:

Joe Voelker (Born 1987), and Mike Voelker (Born 1982), Famous brothers from Florida
Bobby Voelker (born 1979), American mixed martial artist
Christopher Voelker (born 1961), American photographer
David Voelker (1953–2013), American entrepreneur and philanthropist
Frank Voelker, Jr. (1921–2002), American lawyer and politician
Elke Voelker (born 1968), German organist and musicologist
Heidi Voelker (born 1968), American alpine skier
John D. Voelker (1903–1991), American writer

See also
Völker

Surnames from given names